The Aburi Accord or Aburi Declaration  was reached at a meeting between 4 and 5 January 1967 in Aburi, Ghana, attended by delegates of both the Federal Government of Nigeria (the Supreme Military Council) and Eastern delegates led by the Eastern Region's leader Colonel Chukwuemeka Odumegwu-Ojukwu.  The meeting was billed as the last chance of preventing all out war. The council collectively vowed not to use force to settle the Nigerian crisis, and also agreed to a law of collective responsibility which vested all powers of the Federal Military Government (FMG) in the Supreme Military Council, making a unanimous concurrence imperative. It was agreed as well, that the Head of the Federal Military Government should assume the title of Commander-in-Chief of the Armed Forces of Nigeria. The atmosphere of the meeting was very cordial saving that Ojukwu did not participate in the humour side of the show. At the end of the meeting, it was agreed that the resolutions of the meeting should be embodied in a Decree to be issued by Lagos with the concurrence of the military Governors.

Aburi as venue
Aburi, Eastern Region of Ghana was chosen as a venue because the eastern delegates led by the Governor of Eastern State Colonel Ojukwu's safety could not be guaranteed anywhere within the western or northern part of the country.

Agenda of Aburi Meeting

Re-organisation of the Armed forces
Constitutional Arrangement
Issue of displaced persons within the Nigeria.(c)1999-2006 Segun Toyin Dawodu

Delegates

The following are the delegates at the Aburi Conference:
Chairman of the Ghana National Liberation Council -Lt.-General J.A. Ankrah-Chairman
Lt.-Col. Yakubu Gowon- Head of State 
Lt.-Col. Odumegwu Ojukwu - Governor Eastern Region
Major Mobolaji Johnson - Governor Lagos State
Lt.-Col. Hassan Katsina - Governor Northern Region
Lt.-Col. David Ejoor - Governor Mid-Western Region
Commodore Joseph Edet Akinwale Wey - Vice President of Nigeria
Colonel Robert Adebayo - Governor Western Region
Alhaji Kam Selem
Mr. T. Omo-Bare

Others as follows:
N. Akpan Secretary to the Military Governor-East
Alhaji Ali Akilu Secretary to the Military Governor-North
D. Lawani Under Secretary, Military Governor's Office-Mid-West.
P. Odumosu Secretary to the Military Governor-West
S. Akenzua (who later became the Oba of Benin - Erediauwa I) Permanent Under-Secretary-Federal Cabinet Office

The Accord
Aburi accord is as follows: "Members agree that the legislative and executive authority of the Federal Military Government should remain in the Supreme Military Council, to which any decision affecting the whole country shall be referred for determination provided that where it is possible for a meeting to be held the matter requiring determination must be referred to military governors for their comment and concurrence.
Specifically, the council agreed that appointments to senior ranks in the police, diplomatic, and consular services as well as appointment to superscale posts in the federal civil service and the equivalent posts in the statutory corporation must be approved by the Supreme Military Council.
The regional members felt that all the decrees passed since January 15, 1966, and which detracted from previous powers and positions of regional governments, should be repealed if mutual confidence is to be restored.

Breakdown
In response to the accord,  the federal government promulgated Decree No. 8, which was mainly an embodiment of the accord.
The accord finally broke down because of differences of interpretation on both sides. This led to the outbreak of Nigerian Civil War. 
Before the Decree No.8 could finally be issued on March 17, 1967, it had to be passed by the Supreme Military Council meeting which say in Benin on March 10. 
But Ojukwu did not attend that meeting because he had earlier rejected a draft of that decree which made mockery of the Aburi resolutions. 
The really offending clauses of the decree were sections 70 and 71 which empowered the Supreme Military Council to declare a state of emergency in Nigeria, if the Head of Federal Military Government and at least three of the Governors agreed to do so. Section 71 also empowered the Head of the Federal Military Government in agreement with at least three Governors to legislate for any particular region whenever they deemed it fit during a state of emergency, with or without the consent of the Governor of that particular Region. 
In effect, Gowon had thus taken power unto himself to deal with Ojukwu whenever he pleased, how he pleased and as long as he pleased.

References

Nigerian Civil War
History of Nigeria
Peace treaties
Treaties of Nigeria
Treaties concluded in 1967
1967 in Nigeria
Biafra
1967 conferences